The 1987 Sun Belt Conference men's basketball tournament was held February 26–28 at E.A. Diddle Arena at Western Kentucky University in Bowling Green, Kentucky.

UAB upset hosts  in the championship game, 72–70, to win their fourth Sun Belt men's basketball tournament.

The Blazers, in turn, received an automatic bid to the 1987 NCAA tournament. They were joined in the tournament by fellow Sun Belt member Western Kentucky, who received an at-large bid.

Format
There were no changes to the existing tournament format. All eight conference members were placed into the initial quarterfinal round and each team was seeded based on its regular season conference record.

Bracket

See also
Sun Belt Conference women's basketball tournament

References

Sun Belt Conference men's basketball tournament
Tournament
Sun Belt Conference men's basketball tournament
Sun Belt Conference men's basketball tournament
Sports in Bowling Green, Kentucky
College basketball tournaments in Kentucky